Malayochela maassi Is a species of cyprinid fish found in Indonesia, Malaysia and Brunei.  It is the only member of its genus.

References
 

Danios
Monotypic fish genera
Freshwater fish of Malaysia
Freshwater fish of Indonesia
Fauna of Brunei
Taxa named by Petre Mihai Bănărescu
Freshwater fish of Borneo